Tun Samy Vellu s/o Sangalimuthu (8 March 1936 – 15 September 2022) was a Malaysian politician who served as Minister of Works from June 1983 to June 1989 and again from May 1995 to March 2008, Minister of Energy, Telecommunications and Posts from June 1989 to May 1995, Minister of Works and Public Amenities from September 1979 to June 1983 and Member of Parliament (MP) for Sungai Siput from September 1974 to March 2008. He was a member and served as 7th President of the Malaysian Indian Congress (MIC), a component party of the ruling Barisan Nasional (BN) coalition, from October 1979 to December 2010. He is the longest-serving MIC president by holding the position for 31 years and one of the longest-serving Cabinet ministers by being in the Cabinet for 29 years. In December 2010, he announced his retirement from politics, paving the way for then MIC Deputy President G. Palanivel to succeed him as the new party president. 

Former MCA president Ling Liong Sik described Samy Vellu as a man of many talents and a great sense of humour.

Political career
 
Samy Vellu's political career began at the age of 23, in 1959, when he and Govindaraj joined the Batu Caves MIC branch. After five years, he was elected Selangor MIC committee member and the head of the party. He made headline news by climbing up the Indonesian embassy's flag pole, pulling down the flag and burning it. He was charged in court and fined RM2. He was called Hero Malaysia on the front pages.

He was a Member of Parliament for Sungai Siput constituency for eight terms from September 1974 to March 2008. During this time, from 1978 to 1979 he was Deputy Minister of Local Government and Housing. Then from 1979 to 1989 he was Minister of Works. He then served as Minister of Energy, Telecommunications and Posts from 1989 to 1995. From 1995 to March 2008 he was the Minister of Works until he lost his parliamentary seat to Michael Jeyakumar Devaraj of the Socialist Party of Malaysia (PSM) but contested on the ticket of the People's Justice Party (PKR) in the March 2008 general election.

He was the second longest serving minister in the country during his time, after Rafidah Aziz.

Samy Vellu was appointed Malaysia's Special Envoy of Infrastructure to India and Southern Asia, with ministerial rank, since 1 January 2011. The appointment was terminated by the new Pakatan Harapan (PH) government in 2018.

Personal life
Vellu was born in Kluang, Johor, and is of Indian descent. He was married to Indrani Samy Vellu and had one son. He was a chartered architect and a member of the Royal Institute of British Architects (RIBA) and of the Malaysian Institute of Architects.

Biography
A Life. A Legend. A Legacy written by Bernice Narayanan reveals Samy Vellu's achievements and setbacks as well as "behind-the-scenes" events in his almost 50 years of active politics.

Election results
{| class="wikitable" style="margin:0.5em ; font-size:95%"
|+ Parliament of Malaysia  
!|Year
!|Constituency
!colspan=2|Candidate
!|Votes
!|Pct
!colspan=2|Opponent(s)
!|Votes
!|Pct
!|Ballots cast
!|Majority
!|Turnout
|-
|rowspan="3"|1974
|rowspan="6"|P048 Sungei Siput, Perak
|rowspan="3"  |
|rowspan="3"| (MIC)
|rowspan="3" align="right" |9,045|rowspan="3"|49.09%| | 
|Patto Perumal (DAP)
|align="right" |8,401
|45.59%
|rowspan="3"|18,529
|rowspan="3"|644
|rowspan="3"|77.87%
|-
| | 
|Thang Pang Fay (PEKEMAS)
|align="right" | 877
|4.76%
|-
| | 
|RC Manavarayan (IND)
|align="right" | 103
|0.56%
|-
||1978
| |
| (MIC)
|align="right" |12,930|62.41%| | 
|Ngan Siong Hing @ Ngan Siong Eng (DAP)
|align="right" |7,789
|37.59%
|N/A
|5,141
|N/A
|-
|rowspan="2"|1982
|rowspan="2"  |
|rowspan="2"| (MIC)
|rowspan="2" align="right" |14,930|rowspan="2"|64.56%| | 
|T. Sellapan (DAP)
|align="right" |7,033
|30.41%
|rowspan="2"|23,827 
|rowspan="2"|7,897 
|rowspan="2"|73.63%
|-
| |
|Ahmad Zawawi Ibrahim (PAS)
|align="right" | 1,164
|5.03%
|-
|rowspan="2"|1986
|rowspan="3"|P056 Sungai Siput, Perak|rowspan="2"  |
|rowspan="2"| (MIC)
|rowspan="2" align="right" |13,148|rowspan="2"|56.05%| | 
|Liew Sam Fong (DAP)
|align="right" |8,712
|37.14%
|rowspan="2"|24,566
|rowspan="2"|4,436 
|rowspan="2"|69.32%
|-
| | 
|Wan Hassan Wan Mahmud (SDP)
|align="right" | 1,597
|6.81%
|-
||1990
| |
| (MIC)
|align="right" |14,427|53.25%| | 
|Patto Perumal (DAP)
|align="right" |12,664
|46.75%
|28,028
|1,763	
|69.21%
|-
|rowspan="2"|1995
|rowspan="4"|P059 Sungai Siput, Perak|rowspan="2"  |
|rowspan="2"| (MIC)
|rowspan="2" align="right" |21,283|rowspan="2"|71.86%| | 
|Lim Ah Guan @ Lim Soon Guan (DAP)
|align="right" |5,673
|19.15%
|rowspan="2"|30,552
|rowspan="2"|15,610 
|rowspan="2"|67.66%
|-
| |
|Mohamed Hashim Salim (PAS)
|align="right" | 2,663
|8.99%
|-
|rowspan="2"|1999
|rowspan="2"  |
|rowspan="2"| (MIC)
|rowspan="2" align="right" |17,480|rowspan="2"|57.75%| | 
|Michael Jeyakumar Devaraj (DAP)1
|align="right" |12,221
|40.38%
|rowspan="2"|31,165 
|rowspan="2"|5,259 
|rowspan="2"|63.62%
|-
|style="background-color: #000080;" | 
|Mohamad Asri Othman (MDP)
|align="right" |565 
|1.87%
|-
|rowspan="2"|2004
|rowspan="4"|P062 Sungai Siput, Perak|rowspan="2"  |
|rowspan="2"| (MIC)
|rowspan="2" align="right" |19,029|rowspan="2"|62.19%| | 
|Michael Jeyakumar Devaraj (PKR)2
|align="right" |8,680
|28.37%
|rowspan="2"| 31,583
|rowspan="2"| 10,349
|rowspan="2"| 67.51%
|-
| | 
|Sanmugam Ponmugam Ponnan (DAP)
|align="right" |2,890
|9.44%
|-
|rowspan="2"|2008
|rowspan="2"  |
|rowspan="2"| (MIC)
|rowspan="2" align="right" |14,637
|rowspan="2"|44.15%
| | 
|Michael Jeyakumar Devaraj (PKR)2
|align="right" |16,458|49.64%|rowspan="2"| 33,154
|rowspan="2"| 1,821
|rowspan="2"| 69.91%
|-
| |
|Nor Rizan Oon (IND)
|align="right" |864
|2.61%
|}
Note: 1 & 2 Michael Jeyakumar Devaraj amid contesting under the tickets of DAP in the 1999 election and PKR in the 2004 and 2008 elections, is a member of PSM.

 Honours 
 Honours of Malaysia 
  : 
  Grand Commander of the Order of Loyalty to the Crown of Malaysia (SSM) – Tun (2017)
  :
 Grand Knight of the Order of the Territorial Crown (SUMW) – Datuk Seri Utama (2013)
  :
  Grand Knight of the Order of Sultan Ahmad Shah of Pahang (SSAP) – Dato' Sri (2004)
  :
  Commander of the Order of Cura Si Manja Kini (PCM) (1978)
  Knight Grand Commander of the Order of the Perak State Crown (SPMP) – Dato' Seri (1989)
  :
  Knight Grand Commander of the Order of the Crown of Johor (SPMJ) – Dato' (1980)
  :
  Knight Commander of the Most Exalted Order of the Star of Sarawak (PNBS) – Dato Sri (2003)
  :
  Knight Commander of the Order of the Crown of Selangor (DPMS) – Dato'''' (1979)

Notes

References

External links

 Malaysian Indian Congress' Website

1936 births
2022 deaths
People from Kluang
Malaysian architects
Malaysian politicians of Tamil descent
Malaysian politicians of Indian descent
Presidents of Malaysian Indian Congress
Members of the Dewan Rakyat
Government ministers of Malaysia
Grand Commanders of the Order of Loyalty to the Crown of Malaysia
Knights Grand Commander of the Order of the Crown of Johor
Knights Commander of the Most Exalted Order of the Star of Sarawak
Knights Commander of the Order of the Crown of Selangor
21st-century Malaysian politicians
Recipients of Pravasi Bharatiya Samman